Charles Dow (12 January 1874 – 6 June 1942) was an Australian rules footballer who played with Collingwood in the Victorian Football League (VFL).

Notes

External links 

Charlie Dow's profile at Collingwood Forever

1874 births
1942 deaths
Australian rules footballers from Victoria (Australia)
Collingwood Football Club players